Genoa is a statutory town located in Lincoln County, Colorado, United States. The town population was 153 at the 2020 United States Census.

History
A post office called Genoa has been in operation since 1903. The town most likely was named after Genoa, in Italy.

Geography
Genoa is located at  (39.276479, -103.498850).

Climate

According to the Köppen Climate Classification system, Genoa has a cold semi-arid climate, abbreviated "BSk" on climate maps.

Demographics

As of the census of 2000, there were 211 people, 75 households, and 54 families residing in the town. The racial makeup of the town was 84.83% White, 7.58% African American, 0.47% Native American, 3.32% from other races, and 3.79% from two or more races. Hispanic or Latino of any race were 4.27% of the population.

There were 75 households, out of which 36.0% had children under the age of 18 living with them, 58.7% were married couples living together, 9.3% had a female householder with no husband present, and 28.0% were non-families. 22.7% of all households were made up of individuals, and 14.7% had someone living alone who was 65 years of age or older.  The average household size was 2.81 and the average family size was 3.35.

In the town, the population was spread out, with 35.1% under the age of 18, 7.6% from 18 to 24, 21.8% from 25 to 44, 21.3% from 45 to 64, and 14.2% who were 65 years of age or older.  The median age was 33 years. For every 100 females, there were 95.4 males.  For every 100 females age 18 and over, there were 90.3 males.

The median income for a household in the town was $27,375, and the median income for a family was $28,750. Males had a median income of $28,750 versus $22,500 for females. The per capita income for the town was $12,443.  About 10.4% of families and 20.2% of the population were below the poverty line, including 32.1% of those under the age of eighteen and 25.0% of those 65 or over.

Attractions
World's Wonder View Tower, a tourist trap and roadside attraction.

See also

 List of municipalities in Colorado

References

External links

 
 CDOT map of the Town of Genoa

Towns in Lincoln County, Colorado
Towns in Colorado